(also transliterated  / ), is the Arabic term for intelligence, as used by an intelligence agency. In most of the Middle East, the term is colloquially used in reference to secret police agents who spy on civilians. Organizations using the name include:

Egypt
 General Intelligence Directorate (Egypt) (Jihaz al-Mukhabarat al-Amma)

Iraq
 Iraqi Intelligence Service (Jihaz al-Mukhabarat al-Amma), under Saddam Hussein
 Iraqi National Intelligence Service (INIS) (Jihaz al-Mukhabarat al-Watanii al-Eiraqii), since 2004

Israel
 Israel Security Agency (Known as Mukhabarat among arab citizens)

Jordan
 General Intelligence Directorate (Jordan) (Dairat al-Mukhabarat al-Ammah)

Libya
 Intelligence of the Jamahiriya (Mukhabarat el-Jamahiriya), under Muammar Gaddafi

Palestine
 Palestinian Security Forces Intelligence (al-Mukhabarat), official
 Palestinian National Security Forces Intelligence (al-Mukhabarat), paramilitary

Saudi Arabia
 General Intelligence Presidency (Al Mukhabarat Al A'amah)

Syria
 Military Intelligence Directorate (Syria) (Shu'bat al-Mukhabarat al-'Askariyya)
 Air Force Intelligence Directorate (Idarat al-Mukhabarat al-Jawiyya)
 General Intelligence Directorate (Syria) (Idarat al-Mukhabarat al-Amma)

See also
 List of intelligence agencies

References